Idris Assani is a Beninese mathematician, who works as a professor of mathematics at the University of North Carolina at Chapel Hill.

Although born in Niger, Assani is Beninese. He was educated in France, earning a bachelor's degree in commerce from Paris Dauphine University in 1981, a doctorate of the third cycle in mathematics from Pierre and Marie Curie University in 1981, and a doctor of science from Pierre and Marie Curie University in 1986, under the supervision of Antoine Brunel. He joined the UNC mathematics department in 1988 but, allegedly for racist reasons, was turned down for tenure. He appealed through the courts, won his case and gained tenure in 1995, and was promoted to full professor one year later. In doing so he became the first Black tenured associate mathematics professor and the first Black full mathematics professor at UNC, as well as the only mathematician there to be promoted from associate to full so quickly.

Assani's research concerns ergodic theory. He is the author of the research monograph Wiener Wintner Ergodic Theorems (World Scientific, 2003), about mathematics related to the Wiener–Wintner theorem, and is also the editor of several volumes of collected papers.  He has made numerous contributions in the area of nonconventional ergodic averages as well as the return times theorem. Some of the highlights of his research contributions include pointwise convergence of averages along cubes, being “the first complete pointwise convergence result obtained in the theory of nonconventional ergodic averages”, as well as the introduction of Wiener-Wintner Dynamical System  and, which is a class of dynamical system where one can obtain easier proofs of pointwise convergence results in more general setting (with difficult proofs), such as J. Bourgain’s double recurrence theorem as well as the return times theorem.

In 2012, Assani was named as one of the inaugural fellows of the American Mathematical Society.

References

External links
Home page

Idris Assani Author Profile on MathSciNet.  

Year of birth missing (living people)
Living people
20th-century American mathematicians
21st-century American mathematicians
Beninese academics
Paris Dauphine University alumni
Pierre and Marie Curie University alumni
University of North Carolina at Chapel Hill faculty
Fellows of the American Mathematical Society
American people of Beninese descent
20th-century Nigerian mathematicians
African mathematicians